The Hype About Hydrogen: Fact and Fiction in the Race to Save the Climate is a book by Joseph J. Romm, published in 2004 by Island Press and updated in 2005.  The book has been translated into German as Der Wasserstoff-Boom.  Romm is an expert on clean energy, advanced vehicles, energy security, and greenhouse gas mitigation.

Over 200 publications, including Scientific American, Forbes magazine and The New York Times, have cited this book. The book was named one of the best science and technology books of 2004 by Library Journal.

The thrust of the book is that hydrogen is not economically feasible to use for transportation, nor will its use reduce global warming, because of the greenhouse gases generated during production and transportation of hydrogen, the low energy content per volume and weight of the container, the cost of the fuel cells, and the cost of the infrastructure for refueling.  The author argues that a major effort to introduce hydrogen cars before 2030 would actually undermine efforts to reduce emissions of heat-trapping greenhouse gases such as carbon dioxide.

Description of the book
The Hype about Hydrogen contends that global warming and U.S. reliance on foreign fuel imports cannot be solved by the hypothetical hydrogen economy that has been advanced as a possible solution to these problems, and that "neither government policy nor business investment should be based on the belief that hydrogen cars will have meaningful commercial success in the near or medium term."

The book explains how fuel cells work and compares different types.  It then reviews the difficulties in marketing fuel cells for applications other than transportation and argues that these are in fact easier and more likely to happen sooner than transportation applications.

The history of hydrogen and its methods of production are then described. The book discusses steam methane reforming, the most common and cost-effective method of hydrogen production, which involves reacting natural gas with water and emits large amounts of CO2 (a greenhouse gas). As of 2019, 98% of hydrogen was produced either by this method or by methods with even greater greenhouse emissions (like coal gassification), which Romm attributes to the inefficiency of alternative methods such as electrolysis. The monetary costs of hydrogen fueling infrastructure for the U.S. are then estimated at half a trillion U.S. dollars, and the book describes additional energy and environment costs to liquefy and compress hydrogen for use in fueling stations.

The book goes on to discuss the hypothetical evolution of the cost of vehicles with fuel cells and with hydrogen-powered internal combustion engines, as well as possible adoption strategies.  It then reviews the issue of the greenhouse effect and offers four reasons why hydrogen would not be useful in reducing greenhouse gas emissions: 
Internal combustion engines continue to improve in efficiency.
Since hydrogen is likely to be made from combustion of fossil fuels, it produces CO2 and other greenhouse gases as part of the fuel cycle.
Fuel cells are likely to be much more expensive than competing technologies.
Fuels used to make hydrogen could achieve larger reductions in greenhouse gas emissions if used to replace the least efficient of the electric power plants.

The book then describes pilot projects in Iceland and California.

In its conclusion, the book states that hydrogen will not be widely available as a transportation fuel for a long time, and describes other strategies, including energy conservation techniques, to combat global warming.

Critical reception
The Hype about Hydrogen was named one of the best science and technology books of 2004 by Library Journal. The New York Review of Books stated that the book gives "the most direct answers" to the question on the promise of a near-term hydrogen economy, calling Romm "a hydrogen realist". The environmental community newsletter TerraGreen agrees with Romm in the claim that "the car of the near future is the hybrid vehicle", and cites the book's good reception by Toyota's advanced technologies group. The San Diego Union-Tribunes 2004 review noted that Romm's "clear logic" reaches conclusions similar to an authoritative study issued by the National Academy of Sciences.

Three UC Davis scientists who also reviewed the book agreed on its basic premises, but claimed that Romm had made selective use of sources, for example, citing the highest cost estimates, adopting extremely high estimates of efficiency for advanced gasoline vehicles, and giving weight to controversial non-peer-reviewed studies.

Romm and Prof. Andrew A. Frank co-authored an article, "Hybrid Vehicles Gain Traction", published in the April 2006 issue of Scientific American, in which they argue that hybrid cars that can be plugged into the electric grid (Plug-in hybrid electric vehicles), rather than hydrogen fuel cell vehicles, will soon become standard in the automobile industry.

See also
Hydrogen vehicle
List of books about energy issues
Plug-in hybrid electric vehicle
Who Killed the Electric Car?
Hell and High Water

References

External links

Online excerpts from the book
Does a Hydrogen Economy Make Sense?
2007 Toronto Star article on hydrogen vehicles discussing Romm's views

2004 non-fiction books
2004 in the environment
Energy policy
Hydrogen economy
Current affairs books
Climate change books
Books about energy issues
Island Press books